Planets in science fiction are fictional planets that appear in various media of the science fiction genre as story-settings or depicted locations.

Planet lists 
For planets from specific fictional milieux, use the following lists:

Literature 
 Alliance–Union Universe by C. J. Cherryh: planet list
 The works of Hal Clement: planet list
 Childe Cycle by Gordon R. Dickson: planet list
 Demon Princes by Jack Vance: planet list
 Known Space by Larry Niven: planet list
 Noon Universe by Arkady and Boris Strugatsky: planet list
 The Three Worlds Cycle by Ian Irvine: planet list
 Time Quintet by Madeleine L'Engle: planet list
 Uplift by David Brin: planet list
Various works by Kurt Vonnegut: Tralfamadore (different planets with the same name)

Comics 
 DC Comics: planet list
 Marvel Comics: planet list

Film and television 
 Marvel Cinematic Universe: planet list
 Star Wars: planet list

Animation 
 Teenage Mutant Ninja Turtles: planet list

Computer/video games 
 Warcraft: planet list

List of planets 
Planets and the works or franchise they appear in.

See also 
 Fantasy world
 Fictional country
 Fictional universe
 List of fantasy worlds
 Stars and planetary systems in fiction

References

 
 
Lists of fictional locations
 
Science fiction themes